Luis Enrique Cálix Acosta (born 30 August 1965) is a retired Honduran football player who made his name with the national team in the early 1990s.

Club career
Nicknamed El Gavilán (the Hawk), the moustached Cálix started his career at hometown club  Tela Timsa and also played for Real España, Marathón and had an unsuccessful spell in Mexico with Santos Laguna.

His final league game was on 10 July 1999 when he played for Real España against Olimpia.

International career
Cálix made his debut for Honduras in the late 1980s and has earned a total of 47 caps, scoring 9 goals. He has represented his country in 14 FIFA World Cup qualification matches and played at the 1993 UNCAF Nations Cup, as well as at the 1991 and 1993 CONCACAF Gold Cups.

His final international was a June 8, 1994 2-8 demolition by soon to be crowned-World Cup winners Brazil in San Diego in which he scored one of Honduras' consolation goals.

International goals
Scores and results list Honduras' goal tally first.

Managerial career
After he quit playing at 33 years of age, Cálix moved to the United States to work in construction and to become a minor league coach at Kendall Soccer College and Miami FC. He became in charge of Honduran Second Division side Parrillas One ahead of the 2013 Clausura and winning promotion to the top tier.

Personal life
His son Luis Calix played for Miami FC and joined his father at Parrillas One.

Honours and awards

Club
C.D. Real Espana
Liga Profesional de Honduras (2): 1988–89, 1990–91

C.D. Marathón
Honduran Cup: (1): 1994

Country
Honduras
Copa Centroamericana (1): 1993

References

External links

 
 {{Webarchive |url=https://archive.today/20130624215826/http://old.latribuna.hn/2007/08/01/post10014643/ |title=¿Dónde están, quí© hacen? La Tribuna }}
 Un gavilán catracho y su cría triunfan en el fútbol estadounidense (interview about his life in Florida) Hondudiario'' 

1965 births
Living people
People from Tela
Association football midfielders
Honduran footballers
Honduras international footballers
1991 CONCACAF Gold Cup players
1993 CONCACAF Gold Cup players
Real C.D. España players
Santos Laguna footballers
C.D. Marathón players
Honduran expatriate footballers
Honduran expatriate sportspeople in Mexico
Expatriate footballers in Mexico
Liga Nacional de Fútbol Profesional de Honduras players
Liga MX players
Honduran football managers